The Treaty of Nonsuch was signed on 10 August 1585 by Elizabeth I of England and the Dutch rebels fighting against Spanish rule. It was the first international treaty signed by what would become the Dutch Republic. It was signed at Nonsuch Palace, England.

Terms 
The treaty was provoked by the signing of the Treaty of Joinville in 1584 between Philip II of Spain and the Catholic League in which Philip II promised to finance the League.

Elizabeth I agreed to supply 6,400 foot soldiers and 1,000 cavalry (who were to be led by Robert Dudley, the 1st Earl of Leicester) which were initially intended as a way of lifting the siege of Antwerp, with an annual subsidy of 600,000 florins, about a quarter of the annual cost of the revolt. As a surety for this assistance, the Dutch were to hand over Brill and Flushing to England, which it would garrison at its own expense. They were known as the Cautionary Towns.

The treaty granted Elizabeth the right to appoint two councillors to the Council of State of the United Provinces.

The surety provoked the objection of Zeeland, which was to lose the most by this measure. Elizabeth rejected the title of General of the Provinces, offered to her in the treaty.

Aftermath 
Philip II viewed the treaty as a declaration of war against him by Elizabeth I, and the Anglo-Spanish War is conventionally considered to have begun at this point. Three years later, he launched the Spanish Armada and attempted to invade and conquer England. The resources spent by Philip on the Armada (10 million ducats) undoubtedly diverted significant resources from fighting the Dutch revolt. Around 110 million ducats were spent on the partly-successful campaign against the resurgent revolt.

The Treaty of Nonsuch was renewed and amended by the Treaty of Westminster of 6/16 August 1598 between the States-General and the Privy Council on behalf of Elizabeth.

See also 
 List of treaties

Footnotes

External links 
 Primary source for terms of Treaty of Nonsuch 1585

1585 in England
1585 in the Dutch Republic
1585 treaties
Anglo-Spanish War (1585–1604)
Dutch Republic–England relations
Elizabethan era
History of Surrey
Nonsuch
Nonsuch